Cereus repandus (syn. Cereus peruvianus), the Peruvian apple cactus, is a large, erect, thorny columnar cactus found in South America. It is also known as giant club cactus, hedge cactus, cadushi (in Papiamento and Wayuunaiki), and kayush.

Cereus repandus is grown mostly as an ornamental plant, but has some local culinary importance. The Wayuu from the La Guajira Peninsula of Colombia and Venezuela also use the inner cane-like wood of the plant in wattle and daub construction.

Description
With an often tree-like appearance, its cylindrical gray-green to blue stems can reach  in height and 10–20 cm in diameter as a self-supporting plant. There are nine to ten rounded ribs that are up to 1 centimeter high. The small areoles on it are far apart. The gray, needle-like thorns are very variable. They are often numerous, but can also be missing entirely. The longest thorns are up to 5 centimeters long.

The large, cream-colored, nocturnal flowers remain open for only one night and are of vital importance to pollinating bats. The fruits, known locally as pitaya, olala (only in some parts of Bolivia) or Peruvian apple, are thornless and vary in skin colour from violet-red to yellow. The edible flesh is white and contains small, edible, crunchy seeds. The flesh sweetens as the fruit opens out fully. As the cactus grows in arid regions and fruits in the dry seasons, the fruit is an essential source of food for birds in its native range.

Images

See also 
 Arid Forest Research Institute (AFRI)
 List of edible cacti

Footnotes

References
 Anderson, Edward F. (2001): The Cactus Family: 148–149. Timber Press.
 Villalobos, Soraya; Vargas, Orlando & Melo, Sandra (2007): Uso, manejo y conservacion de "yosú", Stenocereus griseus (Cactaceae) en la Alta Guajira colombiana [Usage, Management and Conservation of yosú, Stenocereus griseus (Cactaceae), in the Upper Guajira, Colombia]. [Spanish with English abstract] Acta Biológica Colombiana 12(1): 99–112. PDF fulltext

repandus
Tropical agriculture
Desert fruits
Drought-tolerant plants
Taxa named by Philip Miller